The following lists events that happened during 2011 in Oman.

Incumbents
Sultan: Qaboos bin Said al Said

Events

January
 January 20 - Somali pirates seize a Mongolian bulk carrier off the coast of Oman.
 January 31 - Oman says it has uncovered a spy network from the United Arab Emirates operating in the country.

February
 February 9 - Somali pirates seize an oil supertanker off the coast of Oman.
 February 16 - South Korea will fly the bodies of eight Somali pirates killed in a commando raid on a freighter last month from Muscat to Mogadishu, Somalia.
 February 19 - Pirates seize a yacht with four Americans off the coast of Oman.
 February 27 -  Police clash with anti-government protesters in Sohar, leaving two people dead.

March
 March 1 - Omani police fire into the air to try to disperse the protests in their fourth day, wounding one.
 March 5 - Two government ministers are replaced in response to protests.
 March 6 - Three more ministers are dismissed to respond to protests.
 March 29 - Omani police arrest several protesters and clear a blockade in Sohar.

April
 April 1 - A protester is shot dead by police at a demonstration in Sohar.
 April 22 - Thousands of protesters take to the streets to protest for reform.

References

 
2010s in Oman
Years of the 21st century in Oman
Oman
Oman